Pontus Ek (born 27 June 1975) is a Swedish former rower. He competed in the men's quadruple sculls event at the 1996 Summer Olympics.

References

External links
 

1975 births
Living people
Swedish male rowers
Olympic rowers of Sweden
Rowers at the 1996 Summer Olympics
Sportspeople from Halmstad
Sportspeople from Halland County